Fabio Lucioni (born 25 September 1987) is an Italian footballer who plays as a defender for Serie B club Frosinone, on loan from Lecce.

Career

Ternana, loans and Gela
Born in Terni, Umbria, Lucioni started his career at hometown club Ternana. In January 2008, he was loaned to Lega Pro Seconda Divisione (Serie C2) clubs, namely Monopoli and Noicattaro. After 6 months at Ternana without a league appearance, he left for Gela along with Salvatore Ricca in January 2010. Gela signed Lucioni outright and Ricca on a temporary deal. Lucioni made 15 appearances for Gela.

Siena, Barletta and loans
In July 2010, he was signed by Serie B team Siena for €25,000 and farmed to third division club Barletta in a co-ownership deal, for a peppercorn fee of €500. On 23 June 2011, Siena bought back Lucioni also for €500. However, as Siena was promoted back to Serie A, Lucioni failed to enter first team.

On 22 July 2011, Lucioni joined another third division club Spezia Calcio on a temporary deal. He won the Supercoppa di Lega di Prima Divisione against his former club Ternana as well as promotion to Serie B.

On 5 July 2012, he was named in the 28-man pre-season squad for Siena. However, on 20 July he left the Serie A club altogether.

Reggina
On 20 July 2012, Reggina Calcio signed Lucioni to a new co-ownership deal, for a peppercorn of €250. He wore the no. 6 shirt, which was vacated by Antonio Giosa. He played 11 times in his second Serie B season. In June 2013, Siena gave up their chance to buy back the other 50% of Lucioni's registration rights from Reggina.

The next season he swapped his previous no. 6 for the number 5 jersey, which had been vacated by Gianluca Freddi.

Benevento
Lucioni joined Benevento in 2014. After collecting 36 appearances in the 2014–15 Serie C season, he became the team captain in 2015–16, when he gained promotion to Serie B for the first time in the club's history. He captained his team to another historic promotion, this time to Serie A, in 2016–17, netting 3 goals in the process.

He was alleged to have failed a doping test in September 2017, shortly after Benevento's 1–0 Serie A defeat to Torino; with the defender having tested positive for a banned substance. An Anabolic steroid, known as Clostebol was detected in the sample Lucioni provided. Following this, in January 2018 the Benevento captain was suspended by NADO (Italy's National Anti-Doping Organization). Finally, he was disqualified for one year from the sport.

Lecce
On 20 July 2018 he joined Lecce on a permanent basis. In August 2018 the doping ban was reduced and Lucioni could return to the pitch, making his debut with his new team on 27 August at Stadio Ciro Vigorito, facing his former team Benevento. At the beginning of the 2021-22 season, he assumed the captaincy after Marco Mancosu left the club.

Loan to Frosinone
On 25 June 2022, Lucioni moved on loan to Frosinone.

Honours
Spezia
 Supercoppa di Lega di Prima Divisione: 2012
 Lega Pro Prima Divisione: 2012
 Coppa Italia Lega Pro: 2012

References

External links
 Football.it Profile 

1987 births
Living people
Italian footballers
Ternana Calcio players
A.S. Noicattaro Calcio players
S.S.D. Città di Gela players
A.C.N. Siena 1904 players
A.S.D. Barletta 1922 players
U.S. Lecce players
Spezia Calcio players
Reggina 1914 players
Benevento Calcio players
Frosinone Calcio players
Serie A players
Serie B players
Serie C players
Association football central defenders
People from Terni
Footballers from Umbria
Doping cases in association football
Italian sportspeople in doping cases
Sportspeople from the Province of Terni